Andrew Campbell (born ) was a Scottish professional golfer who played in the early 20th century. Campbell had one top-10 finish in a golf major championship when he finished tied for seventh place in the 1909 U.S. Open. He also finished T43 in the 1914 U.S. Open.

Early life
Campbell was born in Scotland, circa 1887. Like some many other golf professionals from Britain during this period in history, he emigrated to the United States to find a better life and pursue his career as a professional golfer. In 1908 he was serving as the head professional at The Springhaven Club in Wallingford, Pennsylvania.

Golf career

1909 U.S. Open
The 1909 U.S. Open was the 15th U.S. Open, held June 24–25 at Englewood Golf Club in Englewood, New Jersey, north of downtown New York City (Manhattan). George Sargent established a new tournament scoring record to win his only major title, four strokes ahead of runner-up Tom McNamara.

Campbell came out hot in the first round by posting a 71, the best score in that round by any player. His play in the final three rounds wasn't as stellar, however, and he ended up finishing in a five-way tie for seventh place with rounds of 71-75-77-77=300. Campbell's share of the prize money was $35.

Death
Campbell's date of death is unknown.

Results in major championships

Note: Campbell played only in the U.S. Open.

"T" indicates a tie for a place
? = unknown
Yellow background for top-10

References

Scottish male golfers
1880s births
Year of death missing